Fischer Air, briefly rebranded to Charter Air, was a Czech airline headquartered in Prague and based at Ruzyně International Airport.

History
The airline was established 1996. In 2005 it was rebranded as Charter Air to avoid confusion with its new Polish charter subsidiary, Fischer Air Polska. Charter Air was not a success since a month later it was bankrupt. 

In October 2018 plans were announced to restart the airline as air FISCHER as of April 2019. However as of October 2019, there were doubts reported about the airline being relaunched at all and it since never materialized after the relauch had been delayed several times by 2020.

Destinations
Fischer Air operated charter services for tour operator Fischer to over 30 destinations in Europe and Africa, as well as charter flights for other clients. It flew to many holiday destinations in the Mediterranean and North Africa, including Sharm el-Sheikh. It also operated a scheduled service to Malta.

Fleet

As of April 2005, the Fischer Air fleet consisted of the following aircraft:

 3 Boeing 737-300

References

External links

 Official website

Defunct airlines of the Czech Republic
Airlines established in 1996
Airlines disestablished in 2005
Czech companies established in 1996